SharkNinja (officially, SharkNinja Operating LLC) is an American designer, marketer and distributor of home devices and appliances. It is based in Needham, Massachusetts, near Boston. The company's name is formed by combining its two primary brands: Shark, which mainly produces vacuum cleaners and similar devices; and Ninja, which focuses on kitchen appliances such as blenders, multicookers, air fryers, and coffee makers.

History and description
The company has its origins through  Euro-Pro Operating LLC in 1994, when Mark Rosenzweig of Montreal, whose family had run the business for generations prior to its incorporation, developed steam cleaners and upright vacuums. In 2003, Rosenzweig moved the headquarters from Montreal to Needham, Massachusetts.The company changed its name in 2015 to capitalize on its brand names' prominence and popularity. In 2013 the company registered an entity in the United Kingdom and began selling products under the Shark brand. In 2017 the company was acquired by CDH Private Equity from Weston Presidio and American Capital. , it has offices in ten countries and holds over 550 patents, used in over 150 products.

Products

Shark
Vacuum Cleaners
Handheld Vacuums
Robot Vacuums
Stick Vacuums (corded and cordless)
Upright Vacuums
Cylinder Vacuums
Steam Irons
Steam Mops
Air Purifier
Hair Dryer

Ninja
Air fryer
Blenders
Coffee and tea makers
Food processors
Multicookers
Toaster oven/air fryer
Cookware
Ice cream maker

Lawsuits

In 2014, Dyson sued SharkNinja for infringement of three vacuum technology patents, but after four years courts ruled the patents had not been infringed.

In 2019, SharkNinja sued the manufacturer of the Emeril Lagasse Pressure AirFryer for patent infringement, but the case was dismissed.

In January 2021, iRobot sued SharkNinja for false advertising and patent infringement related to robotic vacuum cleaners. As of February 2023, the case is still pending before the United States International Trade Commission.

References

Vacuum cleaner manufacturers
American companies established in 1993
Home appliance manufacturers of the United States
Electronics companies established in 1993
Infomercials
Needham, Massachusetts
Companies based in Norfolk County, Massachusetts
Robotics companies of the United States